The Churchill Falls Generating Station is a hydroelectric underground power station in Labrador. At 5,428 MW, it is the sixteenth largest in the world, and the second-largest in Canada, after the Robert-Bourassa generating station in northwestern Quebec.

Rather than a single large dam, the plant's reservoir is contained by 88 dykes, totalling 64 km in length. The Smallwood Reservoir has a capacity of 33 cubic kilometres in a catchment area of about 72,000 square kilometres, an area larger than the Republic of Ireland. It drops over 305 metres to the site of the plant's 11 turbines.

The plant's power house was hewn from solid granite 300 metres underground. It is about 300 metres long and as high as a 15-story building.

The station cost almost a billion Canadian dollars to build in 1970. Commissioned from 1971 to 1974, it is owned and operated by the Churchill Falls Labrador Corporation Limited, a joint venture between Nalcor Energy (65.8%) and Hydro-Québec (34.2%). Workers at the station live in the purpose-built company town of Churchill Falls.

The ongoing Lower Churchill Project is a joint venture between Nalcor and Emera to develop the remaining 35 percent of the Churchill River basin.

Toponymy
Originally called the Mishtashipu (Big River) by the Innu, in 1821 the river was called Hamilton by Captain William Martin of HMS Clinker, after Sir Charles Hamilton the Governor of Newfoundland from 1818 to 1823. The waterfall itself was called Grand Falls. In 1965, after the death of Winston Churchill the falls, river, town, and generating station were all renamed again.

History

Early investigations

In 1915 Wilfred Thibaudeau surveyed the Labrador Plateau. He designed a channel scheme to divert water before it arrived at the falls. The advantage of the site was the river's drop of more than 300 metres in less than 32 km, and steady supply of water. These findings were confirmed in a 1947 survey, but development did not proceed due to the remoteness of the site and the distance from markets for the power.

In 1954 the region was opened up by the completion of the Quebec North Shore and Labrador Railway which runs north from Sept-Îles, Quebec 575 km north through Labrador to Schefferville, Quebec. In 1963 a 225 MW generating station was built at Twin Falls to supply power to iron mining industries in western Labrador.

Finance
Canada is a federation where legal authority is split between the federal and provincial governments; natural resources such as lumber, petroleum, and inland waterways are under the jurisdiction of provincial, rather than the national government. Since Labrador had no internal market for the power, it had to negotiate with neighbouring Quebec to export the power. Controversy over the ownership of the Labrador Peninsula added to the difficulties of negotiating between Newfoundland and Quebec. A British colony at the time, Newfoundland disputed ownership with the Canadian province of Quebec. The Judicial Committee of the Privy Council in the United Kingdom ruled in favour of the Dominion of Newfoundland in 1927, an unpopular judgment in Quebec. Member of the Legislative Assembly of Quebec Jacques Dumoulin stated that for Canada, the best judges are Canadians. The Quebec government did not accept this judgement as seen by borders on maps issued in 1939 by the Quebec Ministry of Energy and Natural Resources. Certain newspapers called for a takeover of the territory,

In 1953 the British Newfoundland Development Corporation (BRINCO) was formed for the purpose of exploiting Labrador's resources. In 1958, it created a subsidiary, the Hamilton Falls (Labrador) Corporation Limited to develop the hydroelectric project. Through this subsidiary BRINCO obtained a 99 year monopoly on the sale of Labrador hydro power.

BRINCO could not get funding for the generating station without a guaranteed market for its power. In 1963 Quebec nationalized all of its hydro-electric facilities, and proposed to Newfoundland that it do the same with the Hamilton Falls project, which Premier Joey Smallwood refused. BRINCO explored alternatives to sending the electricity to neighbouring Quebec, including sending it to New Brunswick and asking for federal intervention.
But the only practical solution was to negotiate an agreement with Quebec. By 1969, after 16 years of attempts to finance the project, BRINCO was in dire financial straits whereas Quebec was flush with money, further strengthening Quebec's negotiating position. In the end BRINCO would sell 90 percent of the power to Hydro Quebec, at a fixed price, over 40 years renewable for a further 25.

At the time BRINCO was praised for having built the station with no public money from Newfoundland, while Hydro-Québec assumed nearly all the financial risk. It is unlikely that BRINCO would have found other investors willing to take on that risk. In 1981 it made a good return on the investment at almost no risk.

Construction

Construction started in July, 1967, at the time the largest civil engineering project ever undertaken in North America and the largest underground power station in the world.

After five years of non-stop work by 6,300 workers and a cost of almost a billion dollars in 1970, the first two generating units began delivering power in 1971, almost half a year ahead of schedule. In 1974 the station went into full-time production.

The 225 MW Twin Falls power station, opened in 1963, was essential to the later power development at Churchill Falls. It helped open up the area and supplied the power required during the construction phase of the project. In the planning stage, however, it became apparent that greater efficiency in the production of electricity could be achieved by diverting the flow of water from the Ossokmanuan Reservoir into the Smallwood Reservoir. Utilizing this water at the Churchill Falls plant enabled approximately three times as much electricity to be produced from the same volume of water. In July 1974 the Twin Falls plant was closed and the water diverted into the Smallwood Reservoir under an agreement with CFLCo.

Technical characteristics 

The drainage area for the Churchill River includes much of western and central Labrador. Ossokmanuan Reservoir, originally developed as part of the Twin Falls Power System also drains into this system. Studies showed this drainage area collected  of rainfall plus  of snowfall annually equalling  of water per year; more than enough to meet the project's needs.

The machine hall, hewn from solid granite, is almost  underground. The 1,800,000 cubic metres of rock excavated was used in roads, building the town site, and as dike material. It houses 11 generating units. The francis turbine wheels are cast of stainless steel and weigh 73 tonnes each.

Post-construction legal challenges 
In Newfoundland and Labrador, the contract between Churchill Falls (Labrador) Corporation (CFLCo) and Hydro-Québec has created a great deal of resentment. Events unforeseen at the time of the 1969 negotiation have greatly increased Hydro-Quebec's profit margin on the fixed price of energy from the station.

The Government of Newfoundland and Labrador has unsuccessfully challenged the 1969 contract in court. In November 2018, the Supreme Court of Canada rejected a bid to force Hydro-Québec to reopen the contract before 2041, deciding that the high profits of Hydro-Québec did not justify re-opening the contract. The majority decision held that the unforeseeability of future energy price increases was a risk that the CFLCo had assumed when the contract was signed and the court could not force the parties to re-open the contract. Gascon additionally said that unforeseeability would justify overturning the contract only if it made the contract less beneficial to one party and not in this case, where it merely made the contract more beneficial to one party (Hydro-Québec).

In 2019 Quebec's highest court, the Quebec Court of Appeal ruled that Hydro-Quebec's right to sell Churchill Falls energy had a monthly cap, simplifying the management of water resources for the Lower Churchill Project's Muskrat Falls station.

Newfoundland and Labrador will be able to renegotiate the project in 2041, when the contract expires.

Legal cases brought forward by the Innu Nation 
The Churchill Falls hydroelectric plant development was undertaken in the absence of any agreement with the Innu people, but has resulted in significant damage to their traditional territory. Furthermore, Innu burial sites and hunting grounds were destroyed, causing irreparable damage to the traditions and livelihoods of the Innu people. A 2016 study commissioned by the Nunatsiavut Government (government of the Labrador Inuit) concluded that the flooding produced methylmercury and could contaminate the local water, food sources, and health of the Innu in the region. These negative impacts infringe on the aboriginal rights and treaty rights of the Innu people. 

In February 2010, the Government of Newfoundland and Labrador and the Innu Nation initialed an agreement to compensate for the negative impacts of the Churchill Falls plant. The agreement offered the Labrador Innu hunting rights within  of land, plus $2 million (CAD) annually in compensation from Nalcor Energy.

In October 2020, the Innu Nation of Labrador filed a $4 billion (CAD) claim against Hydro-Québec through the Supreme Court of Newfoundland and Labrador. The $4 billion (CAD) figure represents a fair share of Hydro-Quebec's $80 billion (CAD) profits over the 50-years that the hydro-electric plant has been in operation. Furthermore, the Innu Nation have united with First Nations in Canada and the United States to oppose Hydro-Québec's planned transmission line to Massachusetts. A large portion of the energy for this project would be generated in the Churchill Falls hydroelectric plant. 

The timing of this lawsuit comes as the Innu Nation seeks to formalise a land claims agreement with the Government of Canada.

See also
 List of largest power stations in Canada

References

External links
Churchill Falls Hydroelectric project overview at the Institute of Electrical and Electronics Engineers
Nalcor's website

 
Hydroelectric power stations in Newfoundland and Labrador
Newfoundland and Labrador Hydro
Hydro-Québec
Underground power stations
1974 establishments in Quebec
Energy infrastructure completed in 1974